Botanical gardens in Indonesia have collections consisting entirely of Indonesian native and endemic species; most have a collection that include plants from around the world. There are botanical gardens and arboreta in all states and territories of Indonesia, most are administered by local governments, some are privately owned.

Indonesian Institute of Science
 Bogor Botanical Gardens, Bogor, West Java
 Cibodas Botanical Garden, Cianjur, West Java
 Purwodadi Botanical Garden, Pasuruan, East Java
 Bali Botanic Garden, Bedugul, Bali
All 4 of the above Botanic Gardens are under Indonesian Institute of Science.

Public
The rest of the botanical gardens are under Regency/City administrations. Indonesia plans to have a total of 45 Botanical Gardens.

 Ecopark (Cibinong Science Center-Botanical Garden), Bogor, West Java – extension of Bogor Botanical Garden.
 Kuningan Botanical Gardens, Kuningan Regency, West Java
 Baturaden Botanical Gardens, Banyumas Regency, Central Java
 Sukorambi Botanical Garden, Jember, East Java
 Samosir Botanical Gardens, Samosir Regency, North Sumatra
 South Sumatra Botanical Gardens, Palembang, South Sumatra (Under development)
 Solok Botanical Gardens, Solok Regency, West Sumatra
 Jambi Botanical Gardens, Batang Hari Regency, Jambi (Under development)
 Liwa Botanical Gardens, West Lampung Regency, Lampung
 Unmul Samarinda Botanical Gardens, Samarinda, East Kalimantan
 Danau Lait Botanical Gardens, Sanggau Regency, West Kalimantan (Under development)
 Katingan Botanical Gardens, Katingan Regency, Central Kalimantan
 Balikpapan Botanical Gardens, Balikpapan, East Kalimantan
 Banua Botanical Gardens, Banjarbaru, South Kalimantan (Under development)
 Massenrempulu Enkerang Botanical Gardens, Enrekang Regency, South Sulawesi
 Gardenia Botanical Gardens, Minahasa Regency, North Sulawesi (Under development)
 Pucak Botanical Gardens, Maros Regency, South Sulawesi
 Parepare Botanical Gardens, Parepare, South Sulawesi (Under development)
 Lombok Botanical Gardens, Lombok, West Nusa Tenggara
 Kendari Botanical Garden, Kendari, Southeast Sulawesi

References 

Indonesia
Botanical gardens